Kesawan is a district (kelurahan) in West Medan, Medan, Indonesia. This region is filled with historic buildings along Jalan Ahmad Yani (Kesawan Street), the oldest street in Medan.

Notable buildings nearby 
 Deli Park Podomoro City Medan
 Nederlandsch Indische Escompto Maatschappij Office
 Medan Station
 Graha Merah Putih Building
 South East Asia Bank Building
 Tjong A Fie Mansion
 Tip Top Cafe
 Capital Building
 AVROS Office Building
 London Sumatra Building
 Bank Indonesia Office Building
 Bank Rakyat Indonesia Headquarters
 Medan Culture and Tourism Office Building
 Warenhuis Building/AMPI Building
 Deli Tobacco Hospital
 Medan City Hall
 Medan Post Office
 Titi Gantung Bridge
 Bank Modern Building
 Analisa Daily Building (Analisa Daily/Hao Bao Daily)
 Hotel JW Marriott Medan
 Jakarta Lloyd Building
 Inna Dharma Deli Hotel
 Merdeka Walk Hawker Centre

See also 
 Chinatowns in Asia
 Glodok, historical Chinatown in Jakarta

References

Medan
Chinatowns in Asia
Chinese Indonesian culture